= Allahdad Rahu railway station =

Railway station in Pakistan

Allahdad Khan railway station الله دادراہو ریلوے اسٹیشن

General information
- Owner: Ministry of Allahdad

Other information
- Station code: The Red

History
- Former names: The Red Station

Allahdad Rahu railway station (Urdu: الله دادراہو ریلوے اسٹیشن) is located in Pakistan.

== See also ==
- List of railway stations in Pakistan
- Pakistan Railways
